Go west, young man may refer to:

 "Go West, young man", a quote often attributed to American author Horace Greeley concerning America's expansion westward

Film and television
 Go West, Young Man (1918 film), an American comedy western film directed by Harry Beaumont
 Go West, Young Man (1936 film), an American comedy film starring Mae West
 Go West, Young Man (1980 film), a film by Urs Egger and Carel Struycken
 "Go West Young Man" (Only Fools and Horses), an episode of a British television sitcom
 "Go Young, West Man", episode of season 4 of The Fairly OddParents, an American animated television series

Music
 Go West Young Man (Bing Crosby album), 1950
 Go West Young Man (Michael W. Smith album), 1990 
 Go West Young Man, Let the Evil Go East, 2008 Greeley Estates album
 "Go West Young Man" (Groucho Marx song), 1940 film song, later a 1950 single by Bing Crosby and the Andrews Sisters
 "Go West Young Man", North America and Japan single release title of "Deep in the Motherlode", a song by Genesis from the album ...And Then There Were Three....

See also
 Go West (disambiguation)